Eucheirus was a brass-caster statuary.  Teacher  of Clearchus of Rhegium   teacher  to statuary Pythagorus.
He was said to be a native of Corinth and studied there at the schools of the Spartans  Syadras and Chartas.

References

Ernest Arthur Gardner - A handbook of Greek sculpture, Volume 1

Year of birth missing
Year of death missing
Ancient Greek sculptors